Legend of a Gunfighter (also known as ) is a 1964 Western film from West Germany. It stars Thomas Fritsch and was directed by Rolf Olsen. It was part of a boom in German westerns following the success of the Karl May series of adaptations.

It was co written by Don Sharp and co-starred Ron Randell. Both men were Australians. Location shooting took place in Croatia and Slovenia. The film's sets were designed by the art directors Willi Herrmann, Leo Metzenbauer and Otto Pischinger.

Plot

Cast
 Thomas Fritsch as Chris Harper
 Gustav Knuth as Richard Bradley
 Judith Dornys as Meg Bradley
 Heidemarie Hatheyer as Ann Bradley
 Ingrid van Bergen as Linda
 Ilse Peternell
 Peter Neusser as Jack Bradley
 Rudolf Schündler as Rufus Harper
 Ron Randell as Al Nutting
 Walter Giller as Spike Sunday
 Demeter Bitenc

References

External links

1964 films
1964 Western (genre) films
Austrian Western (genre) films
German Western (genre) films
West German films
1960s German-language films
Films directed by Rolf Olsen
Films about dogs
Films shot in Croatia
1960s German films